Bring It On: Fight to the Finish is a 2009 American teen comedy film starring Christina Milian, Rachele Brooke Smith, Cody Longo, Vanessa Born, Gabrielle Dennis and Holland Roden. Directed by Bille Woodruff and the fifth installment in the series of stand-alone films starting with the 2000 film Bring It On. The film was released direct-to-video on DVD and Blu-ray on September 1, 2009.

Plot
Catalina "Lina" Cruz is a tough, sharp-witted Latina cheerleader from hardcore streets of East L.A. who transfers to a posh, elite  Malibu high school after her widowed mother remarries a wealthy man. Lina not only finds herself a fish-out-of-her-environment at her new school, but she faces off against Avery, the wealthy, popular and ultra-competitive all-star cheerleading captain to qualify for a spot on her new school's cheerleading team. With the help of her new quirky sheltered stepsister, Skyler, her former teammates, Gloria and Treyvonetta, and Sky's underachieving cheer team, the Sea Lions, they realize their full potential both on and off the court. But when Avery gets wind that Lina is not only coming after her at the spirit championship but her younger brother Evan as well, Lina learns just how dirty she is willing to play.

Cast 
 Christina Milian as Catalina "Lina" Cruz
 Rachele Brooke Smith as Avery Whitbourne
 Cody Longo as Evan Whitbourne
 Vanessa Born as Gloria
 Gabrielle Dennis as Treyvonetta (Trey)
 Holland Roden as Sky
 Nikki SooHoo as Christina
 Meagan Holder as Kayla
 Laura Cerón as Isabel Cruz
 David Starzyk as Henry
 Brandon Gonzales as Victor
 Prima J as Themselves

Production 
The movie was filmed at locations around Malibu. The field shots were filmed at Occidental College, in western Los Angeles County. The spirit championships were filmed at Glendale Community College in Glendale, California and California State University Northridge in Northridge, California.

Soundtrack 
This was the only film in the series other than the first to actually have a soundtrack album released - via Arsenal Records on September 15, 2009.

 Lean Like a Cholo  - Down AKA Kilo (3:18)
 Rock Like Us - Kottonmouth Kings (2:36)
 I Gotta Get to You - Christina Milian (4:05)
 Ya Mama, Ya Mama - Alabina (4:03)
 Popular - The Veronicas (2:42)
 Corazon (You're Not Alone) - Prima J (3:04)
 Bounce - Fizz & Boog (3:59)
 Get It Girl - World's First (3:59)
Candy Swirl - Montana Tucker(3:09)
 Footworkin' - Keke Palmer (3:15)
 Lift Off - Rachel Suter (3:46)
 Whine Up (Johnny Vicious Spanish Mix) - Kat Deluna feat. Elephant Man (3:18)
 Whoa Oh! (Me vs. Everyone) - Forever the Sickest Kids (3:25)
 Dale - L.A. Rouge (2:27)
 Mueve La Caderas - Andrew Gross (1:03)
 Viva La Celebration - Andrew Gross (1:45)

Marketing  
American Cheerleader Magazine had an interview and photo shoot with cast members Christina Milian, Cody Longo, Vanessa Born, Rachele Brooke Smith and Gabrielle Dennis, which can be seen in the August 2009 issue. Christina Milian is also on the cover of American Cheerleader Magazine's August 2009 issue.

Reception 
Common Sense Media gave the film 2 out of 5 stars.

References

External links 
 

American direct-to-video films
2009 direct-to-video films
2000s English-language films
American teen comedy films
Direct-to-video comedy films
Direct-to-video sequel films
Films shot in Los Angeles
Films set in Los Angeles
2000s teen comedy films
Cheerleading films
Bring It On (film series)
Films directed by Bille Woodruff
Beacon Pictures films
Universal Pictures direct-to-video films
2009 comedy films
2009 films
2000s American films